The Dyaul flycatcher (Myiagra cervinicolor) is a species of bird in the family Monarchidae. It is endemic to Dyaul Island.

Its natural habitats are subtropical or tropical moist lowland forests and subtropical or tropical moist montane forests.

Taxonomy and systematics
The Dyaul flycatcher, the velvet flycatcher (M. eichhorni), and the Mussau flycatcher were formerly considered subspecies, but were reclassified as distinct species by the IOC in 2021. The three species were formerly grouped together as the velvet flycatcher under the scientific name M. hebetior.

References

Dyaul flycatcher
Birds of the Bismarck Archipelago
Dyaul flycatcher